The 11087/11088 Veraval - Pune Express is an express train of the Indian Railways connecting Pune in Maharashtra and Veraval Junction of Saurashtra. It is currently being operated with 11087/11088 train numbers on a weekly basis.

Coach Composition

The train has standard ICF rakes with max speed of 110 kmph. The train consists of 22 coaches :

 1 AC First Class
 1 AC II Tier
 6 AC III Tier
 10 Sleeper Coaches
 2 General Unreserved
 2 Seating cum Luggage Rake

Service

The 11091/Veraval - Pune Express has an average speed of 52 km/hr and covers 1057 km in 20 hrs 15 mins.

The 11088/Pune - Veraval Express has an average speed of 51 km/hr and covers 1057 km in 20 hrs 55 mins.

As the average speed of the train is below 55 km/hr, its fare does not include a superfast surcharge.

Route and halts 

The important halts of the train are:

Rake Sharing 

The train shares its rake with:

 11091/11092 Bhuj - Pune Express
 11089/11090 Bhagat Ki Kothi – Pune Express
 11095/11096 Ahimsa Express
 11095/11096 Pune - Lucknow Superfast Express

Traction

Both trains are hauled by a Vatva Loco Shed based WDP-4 from Veraval to Ahmedabad and from Ahmedabad it is hauled by a Vadodara Loco Shed based WAP-5 electric locomotive up til Pune.

Notes

External links 

 11087/Veraval - Pune Express
 11088/Pune - Veraval Express

References 

Express trains in India
Rail transport in Maharashtra
Rail transport in Gujarat
Transport in Pune